Paradela is a former parish in the municipality of Miranda do Douro, Portugal. The population in 2011 was 165, in an area of 13.84 km². In 2013, the parish merged with Ifanes to form the new parish Ifanes e Paradela. Paradela is the Portuguese settlement farthest removed from the sea, as well as the easternmost point of Portugal.

References

Former parishes of Miranda do Douro
Populated places disestablished in 2013
2013 disestablishments in Portugal